Rio Grande dams and diversions are structures that store water along the Rio Grande or its tributaries, or that divert water for use in irrigation.  
The first diversions were made by the Pueblo Indians over 1,000 years ago.
More permanent diversions were built by the Spanish in New Mexico to feed acequias, or shared irrigation canals.
The first dam to impound the Rio Grande was the Rio Grande Dam, completed in 1914, followed by the Elephant Butte Dam, completed in 1916.

Projects

Several major projects have undertaken construction of dams and diversion in the Rio Grande basin.

The Rio Grande Project built the Elephant Butte Dam and the Caballo Dam.  A number of diversion dams were also constructed in this project, including the Leasburg, Percha, Mesilla, American and Riverside diversion dams.
The Middle Rio Grande Conservancy District built El Vado Dam and the Angostura, Isleta and San Acacia diversion dams.  Rehabilitation of these dams, and construction of the Cochiti Dam were undertaken by the Middle Rio Grande Project.  
The San Juan-Chama Project brings water to the Rio Grande basin from the Colorado River Basin, building the Heron Dam to store some of the water, with an expansion of the El Vado Dam storing some of the remainder.
The Closed Basin Project extracts groundwater from the San Luis Valley and delivers it into the Rio Grande.

Pecos River

The Pecos River is the largest tributary of the Rio Grande, and several dams have been built along it.  These include the Sumner Dam, Santa Rosa Dam, Brantley Dam, Avalon Dam and Red Bluff Dam.

List of structures
Structures include:

References
Citations

Sources

Rio Grande
R
R
Rio Grande